Cauê Castro Menezes Benício is a Brazilian footballer. He has played for various clubs in Europe and Asia. He played for one of the biggest clubs in Vietnam, Hà Nội T&T, as a number 10. He now is a Head Coach and player for FBK Karlstad in Sweden.

Honours

Club
Hà Nội T&T F.C.
V-League (1): 2010
Vietnamese Super Cup (1): 2010

References

External links
 
 Caue Castro Menezes Benicio 

1978 births
Living people
Association football forwards
Expatriate footballers in Vietnam
Expatriate footballers in Indonesia
Brazilian expatriate sportspeople in Vietnam
Brazilian expatriate sportspeople in Indonesia
Indonesian Premier Division players
Persema Malang players
Expatriate footballers in Northern Cyprus
Çetinkaya Türk S.K. players
Expatriate footballers in Thailand
Footballers from Rio de Janeiro (city)
Brazilian footballers